Sarab-e Kulasah (also Romanized as Sarāb-e Kūlasah; also known as Kolasah and Sarāb-e Kūlah Sah) is a village in Howmeh-ye Jonubi Rural District, in the Central District of Eslamabad-e Gharb County, Kermanshah Province, Iran. At the 2006 census, its population was 29, in 8 families.

References 

Populated places in Eslamabad-e Gharb County